Ateme S.A. is a multinational company that specializes in video delivery, namely software for video compression based on H.265 / HEVC standards; MPEG4; MPEG2 encoding / decoding solutions for contribution links, multi-screen live streaming, OTT and CDN solutions; origin-server software and packaging; cloud DVR solutions; and  CDN solutions.  The company has its headquarters in Vélizy near Paris, France, with offices that spread over Europe, North America, South America, Asia and, Australia. 
The company also has a worldwide resellers network and operates globally with clients in more than 60 countries.

Their solutions reduce bandwidth and infrastructure needs for content providers, service providers, MVPDs and OTT. This reduction in turn helps to play its part in reducing the environmental impact of video delivery on worldwide energy consumption.

Products include:
 Kyrion: High-quality/ultra-low-latency encoding/decoding appliance. 
 TITAN: Software suite for origination, acquisition and compression.
 NEA: Software suite for origin, packaging, storage, analytics and CDN.
 AMS/Pilot: Software suite for management, operations and deployment.

ATEME portfolio runs on a Kubernetes cluster on-premises or off-premises using for example AWS, Azure or GCP.

The company is a member of broadcasting associations such as DVB, SMPTE, NAB, SVG, VIDTRANS, iabm, ABU, WTA, SSPI. ATEME maintains a global presence through content providers, service providers, broadcasters and video platforms. ATEME has exhibited at global trade shows such as the IBC and NAB Show.

References

Software companies of France
Software companies established in 1991
Companies based in Paris-Saclay
French companies established in 1991
Companies listed on Euronext Paris